Pieksämäki Airfield is an airfield in Pieksämäki, Finland, about  west-southwest of Pieksämäki town centre.

See also
List of airports in Finland

References

External links
 Lentopaikat.net – Pieksämäki Airfield 

Airports in Finland
Airfield
Buildings and structures in South Savo